Bhagya Lakshmi is a Hindi Indian television drama series which premiered on 3 August 2021 on Zee TV and digital platform ZEE5. Produced by Ekta Kapoor's Balaji Telefilms, the show stars Aishwarya Khare and Rohit Suchanti.

Premise
The show revolves around Lakshmi, a kind-hearted naive girl from a village who gets married to a businessman named Rishi Oberoi. However things take a turn when Lakshmi learns the truth of her marriage.

Plot 

Lakshmi Bajwa is a kind and naive Punjabi Hindu girl from a village who believes in helping others. After the death of her parents, she and her younger sisters, Shalu and Bani, are taken to Mumbai by her aunt, Rano Bajwa. The main intention of Rano was to get Lakshmi quickly married so that she could usurp Manoj's property, as Manoj's last wish was to see Lakshmi happily married. Rano starts treating the Bajwa sisters as servants in her house and even tries to get Lakshmi married to a drunkard driver, Balwinder. Lakshmi saves the life of Rishi Oberoi, a businessman. After a series of events, Lakshmi gets married to Rishi. Lakshmi falls in love with Rishi but gets shocked seeing Rishi's changed behavior with her. 

Later, it's revealed that Rishi's mother, Neelam forced him to marry Lakshmi because Rishi had a "Markesh Dosh" in his horoscope which is a threat to his life and the only way to save Rishi is to get him married to (Lakshmi) a girl who is lucky for him for one year. Rishi already has a girlfriend named Malishka, who is the daughter of Neelam's friend, Kiran, with whom he is planning to get married after one year by divorcing Lakshmi. In a series of events, Lakshmi saves Rishi's life many times. However, Lakshmi comes to know about Rishi's extra-martial affair with Malishka and sadly leaves him. Malishka makes Neelam believe that Lakshmi is unlucky for Rishi and a threat to his life. 

After a misunderstanding created by Rano, Rishi and Lakshmi head for a divorce but are ordered to stay together for 3 months. Lakshmi sees Rishi in bed with Malishka and divorces him. Actually, Malishka had intoxicated Rishi and only pretended to sleep with him, just to show Lakshmi. Rishi realises his mistake and brings Lakshmi home, thus taking the responsibility of marrying off to a deserving man. Malishka tries to obstacles in Lakshmi's path as she believes Lakshmi to be the reason behind Rishi's lack of interest in her. Lakshmi gets into an accident and her condition worsens, which makes Rishi realize his love for her.

Cast

Main 
 Aishwarya Khare  as Lakshmi Bajwa (formerly Oberoi): Kuljeet and Manoj's eldest daughter; Shalu and Bani's elder sister; Neha's eldest cousin; Rishi's ex-wife; Pritam and Rano's eldest niece; Varun and Balwinder's ex-fiancée (2021–present)
 Rohit Suchanti as Rishi Oberoi: Neelam and Virendra's son; Sonia's brother; Harleen and Vishwas's paternal grand-son; Mahendra and Karishma's nephew; Ahana, Ayush and Devika's cousin; Lakshmi's ex-husband (2021–present)

Recurring
 Munira Kudrati as Shalini "Shalu" Bajwa: Kuljeet and Manoj's second daughter; Bani's elder and Lakshmi's younger sister; Neha's second cousin; Pritam and Rano's second niece; Ayush's love interest (2021–present)
 Aman Gandhi as Ayushmaan "Ayush" Chopra: Karishma and Manpreet's son; Ahana's brother; Rishi, Devika and Sonia's cousin; Mahendra, Virendra and Neelam's nephew; Harleen and Vishwas's maternal grand-son; Shalu's love interest (2021–present)
 Maera Mishra as Malishka Bedi: Abhay and Kiran's only daughter; Sonal's best friend; Rishi's obsessive one-sided-lover and ex-girlfriend; Viraj's ex- best friend and ex-fiancee. She hates Lakshmi. (2021–present)
 Mansi Bhanushali as Bani Bajwa: Kuljeet and Manoj's youngest daughter; Lakshmi's and Shalu's younger sister; Neha's youngest cousin; Pritam and Rano's youngest niece (2021–present)
 Smita Bansal as Neelam Oberoi: Virendra's wife; Rishi and Sonia's mother; Vishwas and Harleen's younger daughter-in-law; Mahendra and Karishma's sister-in-law; Ayush, Aahana and Devika's aunt; Kiran's friend (2021–present)
 Uday Tikekar as Virendra Oberoi: Harleen and Vishwas's elder son; Karishma and Mahendra's brother; Neelam's husband; Rishi and Sonia's father; Aayush, Aahana and Devika's maternal uncle; Lakshmi's father-figure (2021–present)
 Neena Cheema as Harleen Vishwas Oberoi: Vishwas' widow; Karishma, Virendra and Mahendra's mother; Aahana, Ayushmaan, Rishi, Sonia and Devika's grandmother; Neelam's mother-in-law (2021–present)
Shivani Jha as Sonia Oberoi: Neelam and Virendra's daughter; Rishi's sister; Vishwas and Harleen's paternal grand-daughter; Malishka's friend; Aahana, Ayush and Devika's cousin; Karishma's niece (2021–present)
 Parul Chaudhary as Karishma Oberoi (formerly Chopra): Harleen and Vishwas' daughter; Virendra and Mahendra's sister; Manpreet's ex-wife; Aahana and Aayush's mother; Rishi and Sonia's aunt; Neelam's sister-in-law (2021–present)
 Hemant Thatte as Manpreet Chopra: Karishma's ex-husband; Ahana and Ayush's father (2021)
 Aditi Shetty as Ahana Chopra: Karishma and Manpreet's daughter; Ayush's sister; Rishi, Sonia and Devika's cousin; Virendra and Neelam's niece; Vishwas and Harleen's maternal grand-daughter (2021–present)
 Bebika Dhurve as Devika Oberoi: Mahendra's daughter; Aahana, Aayush, Rishi and Sonia's cousin; Virendra and Neelam's niece; Harleen and Vishwas's paternal grand-daughter (2021–present)
 Masshe Uddin Qureshi as Pritam Bajwa: Manoj's younger brother; Rano's husband; Neha's father; Lakshmi, Shalini and Bani's paternal uncle (2021–2022)
 Neha Prajapati as Rano Bajwa: Pritam's wife; Neha's mother; Lakshmi, Shalini and Bani's paternal aunt (2021–present)
 Avantika Chaudhary / Tasneem Khan / Urmimala as Neha Bajwa: Rano and Preetam's daughter; Lakshmi, Shalu and Bani's cousin; Rishi and Aayush's ex-one-sided-lover (2021–2022) / (2022) / (2022-present)
 Karan Kaushal Sharma as Abhay Bedi: Kiran's Husband; Malishka's Father (2021–present)
 Karuna Verma as Kiran Abhay Bedi: Abhay's wife; Malishka's mother; Neelam's friend (2021–present)
 Kavita Banerjee as Sonal: Malishka's best friend (2022–present)
 Ankit Bhatia as Balwinder "Ballu" Sood: Lakshmi's ex-fiancé and obsessive one-sided lover; Rishi's former driver; Kamli's husband (2021–present)
 Melanie Pais as Inspector Durga (2022)
 Akash Choudhary as Viraj Singhania: Malishka's best friend and ex-fiancée (2021)
Kaushal Kapoor as Darshan: Lakshmi's employer (2022)
Mridula Oberoi as Kalyani: Lakshmi's boss (2022) 
Virendra Saxena as Manoj Bajwa: Pritam's brother; Kuljeet's husband; Lakshmi, Shalu and Bani's father; Rano's brother-in-law; Neha's paternal uncle (2021) (Dead)
ActorsFirdaush as Arnav: A very good kick boxer and swimmer (2022)
Neelu Dogra as Kuljeet Manoj Bajwa: Manoj's wife; Lakshmi, Shalu and Bani's mother; Pritam and Rano's sister-in-law; Neha's paternal aunt (2021) (Dead)
Syed Ashraf Karim as Gurucharan Anand: Manoj's friend and accountant (2021)

Special appearances
Sriti Jha as Pragya Mehra
Shabir Ahluwalia as Abhishek Mehra
Shraddha Arya as Dr. Preeta Arora Luthra
Dheeraj Dhoopar as Karan Luthra
Anjum Fakih as Srishti Arora
Supriya Shukla as Sarla Arora
Anisha Hinduja as Rakhi Luthra
Abhishek Kapur as Sameer Luthra

Awards and nominations

Adaptations

Production

Casting
Khare and Suchanti were finalised to reprise their roles as leads in May 2021 itself, but due to the lockdown in Maharashtra, they signed the contract only in June.

Filming
The filming and production began on 14 June 2021 in Film City, Mumbai.

Release
The first promotional teaser was released on 16 June 2021, featuring Kundali Bhagya's Shraddha Arya playing Preeta introduce the female-lead of this series, Aishwarya Khare playing the role, Lakshmi.

Following that, on 18 June 2021, another teaser was released featuring Kumkum Bhagya's Sriti Jha playing Pragya introduce Aishwarya Khare as her close-friend, Lakshmi.

Crossover
The show had 4 crossover episodes with Kumkum Bhagya for Holi celebration from 13 March 2022 to 16 March 2022.

References

External links
 
 Official Website

Kumkum Bhagya
Balaji Telefilms television series
Zee TV original programming
Hindi-language television shows
Kalakar Awards winners
Indian drama television series
Indian television soap operas
2021 Indian television series debuts
Television shows set in Mumbai
Indian romance television series
Indian television spin-offs